Halymenia a genus of a macroscopic red algae that grows in oceans worldwide. 

Species have been found in cold temperate areas but the highest diversity is found in warm temperate and tropical regions. For example, 41 names have been reported for the Indo-Pacific (Guiry & Guiry, 2011). Silva et al. (1996) listed 22 names (including two varieties) for the Indian Ocean.

Species
It includes the following species:

Halymenia abyssicola E.Y.Dawson
Halymenia actinophysa M.A.Howe
Halymenia angusta (J.Agardh) De Toni
Halymenia asymmetrica Gargiulo, de Masi & Tripodi
Halymenia bifida E.Y.Dawson
Halymenia brasiliana S.M.P.B.Guimarães & M.T.Fujii
Halymenia californica G.M.Smith & Hollenberg
Halymenia carnosa
Halymenia cerratei C.O.Acleto
Halymenia chiangiana I.A.Abbott & Kraft
Halymenia clathrata E.C.Oliveira, Pinheiro-Vieira & R.E.Norris
Halymenia cromwellii I.A.Abbott
Halymenia curvicornis J.Agardh
Halymenia dilatata Zanardini
Halymenia dubia Bory de Saint-Vincent
Halymenia duchassaingii (J.Agardh) Kylin
Halymenia durvillei Bory de Saint-Vincent
Halymenia echinophysa F.S.Collins & M.A.Howe
Halymenia elongata C.Agardh
Halymenia fasciata Bory de Saint-Vincent
Halymenia fimbriata Zanardini
Halymenia flabellata F.Schmitz
Halymenia floresii (Clemente) C.Agardh
Halymenia floridana J.Agardh
Halymenia foliacea W.R.Taylor
Halymenia formosa Harvey ex Kützing
Halymenia gardneri (Kylin) P.G.Parkinson
Halymenia hancockii W.R.Taylor
Halymenia harveyana J.Agardh
Halymenia hawaiiana Hernández-Kantun & A.R.Sherwood
Halymenia hollenbergii I.A.Abbott
Halymenia hvarii Ercegovic
Halymenia imbricata Dickie
Halymenia integra M.A.Howe & W.R.Taylor
Halymenia jelinekii Grunow
Halymenia kraftii Womersley & J.A.Lewis
Halymenia kuetzingii A.J.K.Millar
Halymenia lacerata Sonder
Halymenia latifolia P.L.Crouan & H.M.Crouan ex Kützing
Halymenia lubrica Suhr
Halymenia maculata J.Agardh
Halymenia megaspora E.Y.Dawson
Halymenia microcarpa (Montagne) P.C.Silva
Halymenia mirabilis D.L.Ballantine & H.Ruiz
Halymenia muelleri Sonder
Halymenia multifida Zanardini
Halymenia naegelii Kützing
Halymenia nukuhivensis N'Yuert & Payri
Halymenia plana Zanardini
Halymenia platycarpa (Harvey ex Grunow) J.Agardh
Halymenia pluriloba Ercegovic
Halymenia polyclada A.Gepp & E.S.Gepp
Halymenia porphyraeformis Parkinson
Halymenia porphyroides Børgesen
Halymenia pseudofloresii F.S.Collins & M.A.Howe
Halymenia purpurascens
Halymenia pusilla Sonder
Halymenia refugiensis E.Y.Dawson
Halymenia rhodymenioides Ercegovic
Halymenia rosea M.A.Howe & W.R.Taylor
Halymenia santamariae W.R.Taylor
Halymenia schizymenioides Hollenberg & I.A.Abbott
Halymenia stipitata I.A.Abbott
Halymenia tenera M.A.Howe
Halymenia tenuispina Kützing
Halymenia tondoana O.DeClerck & Hernández-Kantun
Halymenia utriana W.R.Taylor
Halymenia venusta Børgesen
Halymenia vinacea M.A.Howe & W.R.Taylor

References

Florideophyceae
Red algae genera
Taxa named by Carl Adolph Agardh